Hynhamia conceptionana is a species of moth of the family Tortricidae. It is found in Ecuador.

The wingspan is about 25 mm. The ground colour of the forewings is cream ferruginous, with brownish strigulae (fine streaks) and dots. The markings are brownish. The hindwings are cream, mixed with ferruginous at the apex and with indistinct brownish dots.

Etymology
The species name refers to the collecting locality of the holotype.

References

Moths described in 2007
Hynhamia